Hima may refer to:

 Hima, the Sanskrit word for "snow"
 Himalayas, a mountain range in Asia, meaning "abode of snow" in Sanskrit

People
 Yacine Hima (born 1984), Algerian football player
 Hidekaz Himaruya (born 1985), Japanese Manga artist
 Hima Das (born 2000), Indian sprint runner

Places
 Hima, Jumla, rural municipality in Karnali province, Nepal
 Horse Creek (Kentucky), location of the Hima post office
 Hima, Uganda, a town in Kasese District

Other uses
 Hima (ethnic group), an ethnic group in the Great Lakes region of East Africa; see Hororo people
 Hima (environmental protection), an Arabic word meaning "inviolate zone" (boundary), and a system of environmental protection in Islam
 Hima Cement Limited, a subsidiary of Lafarge, Hima, Uganda
 Histopathology image analysis (HIMA), using automatic equipment to evaluate tissue samples
 Hima, the Khasi name for the traditional states of the Khasi people in the Khasi Hills, Meghalaya, India
 Hima Dushanbe, a football club from Dushambe, Tajikistan
 Humat al-Hima (Defenders of the Homeland), the national anthem of Tunisia

See also
 Hema (disambiguation)
 Himalaya (disambiguation)